The Exolum Group is a spanish multinational company offering services for transportation and storage of oil products. The Exolum Group is made up of Exolum Corporation, S.A., Exolum Aviación, S.A., Terminales Químicos, S.A. (Terquimsa), CLH Pipeline System Ltd (CLH-PS) in the United Kingdom, CLH Aviation Ireland in Ireland, Orpic Logistics Company L.L.C. (OLC) in Oman, CLH Panamá and CLH Aviación Ecuador. The company was formed from what used to be (CAMPSA) (Compañía Arrendataria del Monopolio de Petróleos). CLH is the result of the 1992 spin-off of the commercial assets of the former CAMPSA that was carried out as the culmination of the process of deregulating the oil sector after the approval of new European Community laws that ended the oil monopoly. The Exolum Group's main activity consists of transporting oil products – essentially gasoline, diesels, fuel oils and aviation fuels – from oil refineries to their storage facilities that the company has in Spain, Netherlands and  UK  where its customers' tank trucks load these products and deliver them to the final consumers.CLH holds logistics service contracts for the use of its facilities with most of the operators in these countries and competes with more than a dozen logistics companies that provide the Spanish market with storage and transportation services.

The International Energy Agency has given recognition to the flexibility and capacity this integrated storage and transportation system has for responding to unforeseen events.The company also provides services related to consultancy and advice for international companies in the oil or logistics sectors, gaining its first experiences in countries such as Brazil, Colombia and Oman. Another service that CLH is fostering is strategic storage for European Union countries.

CLH Aviación, created in 1997, is a wholly owned subsidiary of CLH, and operates at most of the Spanish airports in the Iberian Peninsula and Balearic Islands.  They offer services for the storage, distribution and into-plane supply of aviation fuels and lubricants. CLH Aviación also provides advice and technical assistance for the installation and maintenance of distribution networks for different types of aviation fuel.
The company has been given recognition by external bodies, for example, the highest rating in the world for sustainability in its sector, given by SAM (Sustainable Asset Management), the European Seal of Excellence 500+, various quality certificates from AENOR and the Family-Responsible Company (EFR) seal of approval.

Share structure 
Royal Decree-Law 6/2000 prohibits any CLH shareholder from holding more than 25% of the total number of company shares.

The shareholdings are distributed as follows:

Infrastructure

Storage 
Exolum has 40 storage facilities, with a capacity of more than 8 million cubic meters, for all types of oil products. They are distributed across Spain, the Balearic Islands and in many countries across Europe and the UK.

Pipelines 
The Exolum Group logistics system is the most extensive civil pipeline network in Western Europe.

Merchant fleet 
The Exolum Group has two tankers in its fleet, the Tinerfe and the Castillo de Trujillo, that are used for transporting fuel to the Balearic Islands and to areas in the Peninsula that are not reached by the pipeline network.

Airport facilities 
CLH Aviación has 28 airport facilities that are located in the major Spanish airports in the Iberian Peninsula and the Balearic Islands, where it provides aviation fuel supply services to aircraft.

At Madrid/Barajas, Barcelona, Palma, Malaga and Alicante, the company has hydrant networks laid beneath the airport apron, which enable aircraft to be refuelled without the need to use tanker vehicles. It also has a fleet of 113 refuellers and 48 hydrant dispenser vehicles that are specially designed for supplying aircraft with fuel.

International Expansion

CLH-PS
CLH Pipeline System (CLH-PS) Ltd is an oil product logistics company, wholly owned by CLH, that carries out its activities in the United Kingdom. CLH-PS provides its services to several military facilities and some of the main airports in the United Kingdom. It is the main fuel pipeline and storage facility network in that country. Its infrastructure consists of a pipeline network of 2,000 kilometers, which represents 50% of the British pipeline network, and 15 storage facilities with a total capacity of over one million cubic metres.
CLH-PS supplies 35% of the demand for aviation fuel in the United Kingdom. Heathrow, Gatwick, Stansted and Manchester are among the main airports it supplies, in addition to other 10 regional airports that are supplied by road tanker. CLH Pipeline System is currently carrying out a major modernization program in its infrastructures with the aim of improving safety and efficiency and reducing costs.

CLH Aviation Ireland
CLH Aviation Ireland is wholly owned by CLH Aviación and manages the fuel storage terminal at Dublin Airport, where it provides logistics services for the receipt, storage and dispatch of Jet A1. The company manages the aviation fuel infrastructure at Dublin Airport under an open-access (non-discriminatory) system for all oil suppliers that operate at this airport and the different into-plane agents. In addition, CLH Aviation Ireland is currently undertaking a major renovation project at the terminal, including the expansion of the plant capacity and the construction of a new hydrant system. The new facility will include three storage tanks of 5,000 cubic meters each, office and service buildings, parking area, pumping stations, loading systems for into-plane units, in addition to the most advanced safety systems. The project also involves the construction of a hydrant system at the airport boarding piers to facilitate into-plane operations, which will be connected to the storage terminal, thus allowing for smoother, faster, that is, more efficient, into-plane operations.

OLC 
CLH has a 40% shareholding in a joint venture entered into with the Omani company ORPIC (owner of the 60% share) under the name of Orpic Logistics Company (OLC), which is responsible for the construction and management of a storage facility near Muscat, the capital of Oman, and a network of multiproduct pipelines linking the new storage facility with two existing refineries in the country and the international airport in Muscat. In 2022, OQ Group repurchased Exolum's stake in OLC.

References

External links 
 
 Stock market listing data

Oil companies of Spain
Oil pipeline companies
Transport companies of Spain
Non-renewable resource companies established in 1927
Spanish companies established in 1927